Nils Thore "Nick" Borgen, born 5 January 1952 in Andenes, Nordland, is a Norwegian–Swedish musician, singer and writer (debut novel: "Den okända soldaten", 2009). He's famous for songs like We Are All the Winners and Den glider in. Between 1990 and 2003, he had an own dansband, Nick Borgens orkester.

References

External links 

1952 births
Living people
People from Andøy
Dansband singers
Melodifestivalen contestants of 1997
Melodifestivalen contestants of 1996
Melodifestivalen contestants of 1994
Melodifestivalen contestants of 1993